Yannick Chevalier (born 27 May 1987) is a Martinois footballer who plays as a forward for US Châteauneuf-sur-Loire and the Saint Martin national team.

Career statistics

International goals
Scores and results list Saint Martin's goal tally first.

References

External links

1987 births
Living people
Association football forwards
French footballers
Saint Martinois footballers
Sportspeople from Saint-Denis, Seine-Saint-Denis
AS Beauvais Oise players
Angers SCO players
Valenciennes FC players
US Orléans players
Thonon Evian Grand Genève F.C. players
Thouars Foot 79 players
Olympique Saumur FC players
Saint-Pryvé Saint-Hilaire FC players
Championnat National 3 players
Championnat National players
Championnat National 2 players
Saint Martin international footballers
Footballers from Seine-Saint-Denis